Callachan is a British surname that originates from the Irish Ceallachán. It may refer to the following notable people:
Harry Callachan (1903–1990), Scottish football player
Ralph Callachan (born 1955), Scottish football player
Ross Callachan (born 1993), Scottish football player

See also
 Cellachán Caisil

References

English-language surnames